The 2018 Asian Junior and Cadet Table Tennis Championships were held in Nay Pyi Taw, Myanmar, from 13 to 18 August 2018. It was organised by the Myanmar Table Tennis Federation under the authority of Asian Table Tennis Union (ATTU).

Medal summary

Events

Medal table

See also

2018 World Junior Table Tennis Championships
Asian Table Tennis Championships
Asian Table Tennis Union

References

Asian Junior and Cadet Table Tennis Championships
Asian Junior and Cadet Table Tennis Championships
Asian Junior and Cadet Table Tennis Championships
Asian Junior and Cadet Table Tennis Championships
Table tennis in Myanmar
International sports competitions hosted by Myanmar
Asian Junior and Cadet Table Tennis Championships